Iron fish may refer to:

Lucky iron fish, a dietary iron supplement
Code word for "submarine" used by the Navajo code talkers
The Iron Fish, one of the Beano comic strips
"The Iron Fish", a submersible used by Jimmy Grey in The League of Extraordinary Gentlemen comic book series
City of the Iron Fish, a novel by Simon Ings